Kamir, also known as khamir or samir is a round-shaped bread that almost similar to apem or pancake, consists of flour, butter, and egg mixture, sometimes mixed with other fillings ingredients such as banana, tapai, strawberry, pineapple, jackfruit, cheese, and chocolate.

This bread is known in Arab-Javanese community in Indonesia, especially Pemalang Regency, Central Java.

Description

This bread or cake is round-shaped, flat brown and almost resembles to apem or pancake but slightly larger and slender. The size is variative, the largest size up to the size of a dinner plate, while the smallest resemble the size of a small sauce bowl.

See also

 Pukis, a similar Indonesian hotcake
 Dorayaki, a similar Japanese small pancake
 Cuisine of Indonesia
 Arab Indonesian cuisine
 Javanese cuisine

References

Indonesian breads
Javanese cuisine